Édouard Niermans (born 10 November 1943) is a French film director, screenwriter and actor. His film The Return of Casanova was entered into the 1992 Cannes Film Festival.

Selected filmography
 It Only Happens to Others (1971) (actor only)
  (1987)
 The Return of Casanova (1992)
 Le Septième Juré (2008)

References

External links

1943 births
Living people
French film directors
French male screenwriters
French screenwriters
French male film actors
Male actors from Paris